Timothy Christian School may refer to:

 Timothy Christian School (Illinois), United States
 Timothy Christian School (New Jersey), United States